Lebanese Maronite Christians are adherents of the Maronite Church in Lebanon, which is the largest Christian denomination in the country. The Maronite Church is an Eastern Catholic Church in full communion with the worldwide Catholic Church.

The Lebanese Maronite Christians are believed to constitute about 30% of the total population of Lebanon according to election results. Lebanon's constitution was intended to guarantee political representation for each of the nation's ethno-religious groups.

The Maronite Catholics and the Druze founded modern Lebanon in the early eighteenth century, through the ruling and social system known as the "Maronite-Druze dualism" in Mount Lebanon Mutasarrifate. Under the terms of an unwritten agreement known as the National Pact between the various political and religious leaders of Lebanon, the president of the country must be a Maronite.

History

The cultural and linguistic heritage of the Lebanese people is a blend of both indigenous Phoenician elements and the foreign cultures that have come to rule the land and its people over the course of thousands of years. In a 2013 interview the lead investigator of the National Geographic Society's Genographic Project, Pierre Zalloua, pointed out that genetic variation preceded religious variation and divisions: "Lebanon already had well-differentiated communities with their own genetic peculiarities, but not significant differences, and religions came as layers of paint on top. There is no distinct pattern that shows that one community carries significantly more Phoenician than another."

The followers of Jesus Christ first became known as "Christians" in the ancient Greek city of Antioch (Acts 11:26), and the city became a center for Christianity - especially after the destruction of Jerusalem in AD 70. According to Catholic tradition, the first Bishop was Saint Peter before his travels to Rome. The third Bishop was the Apostolic Father Ignatius of Antioch. Antioch became one of the five original Patriarchates (the Pentarchy) after Constantine recognized Christianity.

The Maronite Christianity derived its name and religious identity from Saint Maron whose followers migrated to the area of Mount Lebanon (present day Republic of Lebanon) from their previous location of residence around the area of Antioch (an ancient Greek city within present day Hatay Province, Turkey), establishing the nucleus of the Maronite Church.

More specifically, Maron, a fourth-century monk and the contemporary and friend of St. John Chrysostom, left Antioch for the Orontes River to lead an ascetic life, following the traditions of Anthony the Great of the Desert and Pachomius. Many of his followers also lived a monastic lifestyle. Following the death of Maron in 410, his disciples built a monastery in his memory and formed the nucleus of the Maronite Church.

The Maronites held fast to the beliefs of the Council of Chalcedon in 451. When the Monophysites of Antioch slew 350 monks, the Maronites sought refuge in the mountains of Lebanon. Correspondence concerning the event brought the Maronites papal and orthodox recognition, which was solidified by Pope Hormisdas (514–523) on February 10, 518. A monastery was built around the shrine of St. Maro (Marun) after the Council of Chalcedon.

The martyrdom of the Patriarch of Antioch in the first decade of the seventh century, either at the hands of Persian soldiers or local Jews, left the Maronites without a leader, a situation which continued because of the final and most devastating Byzantine–Sassanid War of 602–628. In the aftermath of the war, the Emperor Heraclius propagated a new Christological doctrine in an attempt to unify the various Christian churches of the east, who were divided over accepting the Council of Chalcedon. This doctrine, monothelitism, was meant as a compromise between supporters of Chalcedon, such as the Maronites, and opponents, such as the Jacobites. To win back the Monophysites, Monoenergism was first advocated by Patriarch Sergius I of Constantinople. Pope Honorius I (625–638) of Rome naively called for an end to dispute and interpreted Sergius' view as true since Christ exhibited only one will insofar as His sinless human will never disagreed with His divine will.

Instead, the Patriarch of Constantinople's doctrine and subsequent Monothelitism caused greater controversy and was declared a heresy at the Sixth Ecumenical Council in 680-681. Contemporary Greek, Latin and Arab sources indicate that the Maronites accepted monothelitism, rejected the sixth council, and continued to maintain a belief in the largely discredited monothelite doctrine for centuries, only moving away from monothelitism in the time of the crusades in order to avoid being branded heretics by the crusaders. The modern Maronite Church, however, rejects the assertion that the Maronites were ever monothelites separated from the rest of the universal Church. The question remains a cause of significant offence to this day.

In 687, the Emperor Justinian II agreed to evacuate many thousand Maronites from Lebanon and settle them elsewhere. The chaos and utter depression which followed led the Maronites to elect their first Patriarch, John Maroun, that year. This, however, was seen as a usurpation by the then undivideded Orthodox Catholic church. Thus, at a time when Islam was rising on the borders of the Byzantine Empire and a united front was necessary to keep out Islamic infiltration, the Maronites were focused on a struggle to retain their independence against imperial power. This situation was mirrored in other Christian communities in the Byzantine Empire and helped facilitate the Muslim conquest of most of Eastern Christendom by the end of the century.

The relationship between the Druze and Christians has been characterized by harmony and peaceful coexistence, with amicable relations between the two groups prevailing throughout history, with the exception of some periods, including 1860 Mount Lebanon civil war. The Maronite Catholics and the Druze founded modern Lebanon in the early Eighteenth Century, through a governing and social system known as the "Maronite-Druze dualism" in the Mount Lebanon Mutasarrifate.

Culture

Religion

The Maronites belong to the Maronite Syriac Church of Antioch (a former ancient Greek city now in Hatay Province, Turkey) is an Eastern Catholic Syriac Church that had affirmed its communion with Rome since 1180, although the official view of the Church is that it had never accepted either the Monophysitic views held by their Syriac neighbours, which were condemned in the Council of Chalcedon, or the failed compromise doctrine of Monothelitism (the latter claim being found in contemporary sources). The Maronite Patriarch is traditionally seated in Bkerke, north of Beirut.

Geographic distribution within Lebanon
Lebanese Maronite Christians are concentrated in the north Beirut, northern part of Mount Lebanon Governorate, southern part of North Governorate, parts of Beqaa Governorate and South Governorate.

Demographics

Note that the following percentages are estimates only. However, in a country that had last census in 1932, it is difficult to have correct population estimates.

The last Census in Lebanon in 1932 put the numbers of Maronites at 60%. A study done by the Central Intelligence Agency (CIA) in 1985 put the numbers of Maronites at 46% of the population.

In 2012, Maronites constituted 31% of Lebanon's population, according to estimates. The Maronite Church's website claims 1,062,000 members were in Lebanon in 1994 which would have made them around 31% of Lebanon's population. Maronite Catholics are the largest Christian group, followed by Greek Orthodox.

Lebanese Maronite-born Notables

 Michel Aoun, President of Lebanon (2016–present)
 Camille Chamoun, President of Lebanon (1952–1958)
 Fuad Chehab, President of Lebanon (1958–1964)
 Charles Helou, President of Lebanon (1964–1970)
 Émile Eddé
 Christophe Zakhia El-Kassis, Maronite archbishop and Vatican Ambassador to Pakistan
 Bechara El Khoury, President of Lebanon (1943–1952)
 Habib Pacha Es-Saad
 Suleiman Frangieh, President of Lebanon (1970–1976)
 Elias Sarkis, President of Lebanon (1976–1982)
 Bachir Gemayel, President of Lebanon 1982
 Amine Gemayel, President of Lebanon (1982–1988)
 Elias Hrawi, President of Lebanon (1989–1998)
 Khalil Gibran
 Émile Lahoud, President of Lebanon (1998–2007)
 Alfred Naqqache
 Michel Suleiman, President of Lebanon (2008–2014)

See also

 Religion in Lebanon
 Christianity in Lebanon
 Catholic Church in Lebanon
 Maronite Church
 East Beirut canton (Marounistan)
 Maronite flag
 Lebanese Melkite Christians
 Lebanese Protestant Christians
 Lebanese Greek Orthodox Christians
 Lebanese Shia Muslims
 Lebanese Sunni Muslims
 Lebanese Druze

References

External links

 Baladites: Official website of the Lebanese Maronite Order 
 Antonins:  Official website of the Lebanese Antonin Order 
 Aleppians: Official Website of the Mariamite Maronite Order (O.M.M.)  
 Kreimists or Lebanese missionaries: Official website of the Congregation of Maronite Lebanese Missionaries
 The Syriac Maronites